Jamestown often refers to:
Jamestown, Virginia, the first permanent English settlement in the Americas

Jamestown may also refer to

Places

Australia
Jamestown, South Australia

Barbados
Holetown, Saint James, Barbados; sometimes called its founding name, Jamestown

Canada
Mount Olive-Silverstone-Jamestown, a neighbourhood in Toronto, Ontario commonly referred to as Smithfield
St. James Town, a neighbourhood in Toronto, Ontario
Jamestown, Newfoundland and Labrador, a former settlement

Ghana
Jamestown, Ghana, a district of the city of Accra

Ireland
Jamestown, Churchtown, a townland in Churchtown civil parish, barony of Rathconrath, County Westmeath
Jamestown, Conry, a townland in Conry civil parish, barony of Rathconrath, County Westmeath
Jamestown, County Laois
Jamestown, County Leitrim

Malaysia
 Jamestown, an alternate name for Bayan Lepas, Penang

New Zealand
 Jamestown, New Zealand, an abandoned settlement in northern Fiordland

Saint Helena, Ascension and Tristan da Cunha
Jamestown, Saint Helena, a harbour and the capital of Saint Helena

Saint Kitts and Nevis
Jamestown, the name of a former town on the edge of Morton Bay on Nevis in the late 17th century

South Africa
Jamestown, Eastern Cape
Jamestown, Western Cape

United Kingdom
Jamestown, Easter Ross, Scotland
Jamestown, West Dunbartonshire, Scotland
Jamestown, Fife, Scotland

United States
 Jamestown, California
 Jamestown, Colorado
 Jamestown, Georgia
 Jamestown, Indiana, in Boone County
 Jamestown, Elkhart County, Indiana
 Jamestown, Steuben County, Indiana
 Jamestown, Kansas
 Jamestown, Kentucky, in Campbell County (now part of Dayton, Kentucky)
 Jamestown, Kentucky, in Russell County
 Jamestown, Louisiana
 Jamestown, Missouri
 Jamestown, New Mexico
 Jamestown, New York, the largest American city bearing the name
 Jamestown, North Carolina
 Jamestown, North Dakota, the second largest city bearing the name
 Jamestown, Ohio, a village
 Jamestown, Morrow County, Ohio, a ghost town
 Jamestown, Oklahoma
 Jamestown, Pennsylvania
 Jamestown, Rhode Island
 Jamestown, South Carolina
 Jamestown, Tennessee
 Jamestown, Texas, an unincorporated community in Smith County, Texas
 Jamestown, Virginia, the first permanent English settlement in what is now the United States
 Jamestown Settlement, the living history museum reconstruction of the town
 Historic Jamestowne, the archaeological site of the original town
 Jamestown S'Klallam Indian Reservation, an Indian reservation in Washington
 Jamestown, West Virginia
 Jamestown, Wisconsin
 James Town, Wyoming
 Jamestown Township, Steuben County, Indiana
 Jamestown Charter Township, Michigan
 Jamestown Township, Blue Earth County, Minnesota
 Jamestown Dam, a dam in North Dakota

Other uses
 Jamestown (horse), American Champion racehorse
 Jamestown (ship), a large sailing ship carrying valuable lumber which was abandoned and ran aground off Iceland in 1881
 Jamestown (TV series), a 2017 British television series
 Jamestown (video game), a shoot-'em-up video game set in a steampunk alternate universe in which Jamestown Colony is settled on Mars
 The Indian massacre of 1622, often referred to as the Jamestown Massacre, in the Virginian town of Jamestown
 USS Jamestown, any one of a number of United States Navy vessels
 "Jamestown", a song by The Movielife from the album Forty Hour Train Back to Penn (2003)
 Jamestown Foundation, a Washington, D.C.-based think tank
 Jamestown Revival, a folk, folk rock, and Americana duo from Magnolia, Texas

See also
 Old Jamestown, Missouri
 Jameston, Pembrokeshire